Cynthia Barker (May 25, 1962 - September 14, 2020) was a Filipino-born British politician who served as mayor of Hertsmere, England until her death.

She served as town councillor for Elstree and Borehamwood and borough councillor for Potters Bar from May 2015 to May 2019. She was re-elected to Hertsmere to represent the Borehamwood Kenilworth ward in May 2019.

Her role at the town council included working with the community, with the aim of improving the wellbeing of residents' lives. As vice-chair of the Entertainments Committee, she played an active role in choosing events and entertainments for the local residents. She was one of the two town council representatives for the Youth Council.

For Hertsmere, Barker served on a variety of committees including Operations Review, Audit and Member Training and Development Group, which she chaired for three years. In the new municipal year 2019-2020, she joined the Asset Management Panel, Personnel Appeals, Policy Review and Local Joint Committee.

Barker was a trustee for Elstree and Borehamwood Museum, trustee for the Sixty Plus Club, school governor for St. Nicholas Church of England School, committee member of Elstree and Borehamwood NSPCC branch and a member of Rotary Club of Elstree and Borehamwood, all as voluntary roles.

She was born in Laguna, Philippines as Cynthia Alcantara. She studied Industrial Engineering in Adamson University.

Death 
Barker died on September 14, 2020, following "a bout of serious illness". It is unknown as to what specifically caused her death.

References

1962 births
2020 deaths
Women mayors of places in England
Adamson University alumni
21st-century British women politicians
21st-century English women
21st-century English people